Pappiella is a subgenus of flies belonging to the family Lesser Dung flies.

Species
O. liliputana (Rondani, 1880)

References

Sphaeroceridae
Diptera of Europe
Diptera of North America
Insect subgenera